John McConnell Rice (February 19, 1831 – September 18, 1895) was a United States representative from Kentucky. He was born in Prestonsburg, Kentucky where he received a limited schooling. He graduated from a Louisville, Kentucky law school in 1852, was admitted to the bar in 1853, and commenced practice in Pikeville, Kentucky.

Rice was the superintendent of schools of Pike County, Kentucky in 1854 and was then elected prosecuting attorney of Pike County in 1856. He served as a member of the Kentucky House of Representatives in 1858 before moving to Louisa, Kentucky in 1860. He was again a member of the Kentucky House of Representatives in 1861.

Rice was elected as a Democrat to the Forty-first and Forty-second Congresses (March 4, 1869 – March 3, 1873) but was not a candidate for renomination in 1872. Rice and John T. Zeigler disputed the November 1868 election, and the seat was vacant while in dispute. After leaving Congress, he resumed the practice of law in Louisa, Kentucky  and was appointed judge of the Lawrence County, Kentucky criminal court in 1883 and was elected to the same office in 1884. He was reelected in 1890 and served until his death in Louisa, Kentucky in 1895. He was buried in Pine Hill Cemetery.

References

1831 births
1895 deaths
Kentucky lawyers
Democratic Party members of the Kentucky House of Representatives
People from Prestonburg, Kentucky
Democratic Party members of the United States House of Representatives from Kentucky
People from Louisa, Kentucky
People from Pike County, Alabama
19th-century American politicians
19th-century American lawyers